Manheim Township is the name of some places in the U.S. state of Pennsylvania:

Manheim Township, Lancaster County, Pennsylvania
Manheim Township High School
Manheim Township School District
Manheim Township, York County, Pennsylvania

Other
West Manheim Township, York County, Pennsylvania
North Manheim Township, Schuylkill County, Pennsylvania
South Manheim Township, Schuylkill County, Pennsylvania

Pennsylvania township disambiguation pages